Nerio Acciaioli  is the name of:
Nerio I Acciaioli (died 1394), Italian aristocrat
Nerio II Acciaioli (1416–1451), Duke of Athens